Lichen aureus  is a skin condition characterized by the sudden appearance of one or several golden or rust-colored, closely packed macules or lichenoid papules.

See also 
 Pigmentary purpuric eruptions
 List of cutaneous conditions

References

External links 

Vascular-related cutaneous conditions